{{Infobox concert
| concert_tour_name = Loud Tour
| image             = Loud Tour poster.png
| image_size        = 220px
| image_caption     = Promotional poster for the tour
| artist            = Rihanna
| albums             = Loud| start_date        = 
| end_date          = 
| number_of_shows   = 98
| number_of_legs    = 4
| gross             = $90 million ($ million in  dollars) 
| last_tour         = Last Girl on Earth Tour(2010–11)
| this_tour         = Loud Tour(2011)
| next_tour         = Diamonds World Tour(2013)
}}
The Loud Tour was the fourth overall and third world concert tour by Barbadian recording artist Rihanna. Performing in over twenty countries in the Americas and Europe, the tour was launched in support of Rihanna's fifth studio album Loud (2010). Critics acclaimed the show for its liveliness and higher caliber of quality when compared to Rihanna's previous tours. The Loud Tour was a large commercial success, experiencing demand for an extension of shows in the United Kingdom due to popularity. In London, Rihanna played a record-breaking 10 dates at The O2 Arena. The tour ultimately grossed an estimated value of US$90 million from 98 reported shows and a total audience of 1,200,800. The Loud Tour became the seventh-highest-grossing tour of 2011.

Background

The tour was officially announced on February 9, 2011, when North American dates were revealed. The tour was described as an "all new production, costumes and stage design creating a visual and audio event with the once in a lifetime excitement her fans around the world have come to expect from one of the brightest stars in music today." Speaking about the tour, Rihanna stated that "We're creating an incredible ride with this tour. I'm excited to get out on the road and share my new music from this album. We are going to have an amazing time and I know my fans are ready to get LOUD!" During an interview with Ryan Seacrest after she performed "California King Bed" on American Idol April 14, 2011, the singer spoke about the tour's development. Rihanna addressed rumors about a special performance to be included on the setlist in order to fully incorporate her fans into the experience, saying: When asked by Seacrest about the fan experience, she joked ""You always know the inside scoop!" before continuing to say "Right now, we just designed the stage. I'm really not supposed to say this, but I want to get you excited ... We're building two sections on the stage [for the fans. They'll be] closer than they've ever been. It's real VIP."

CeeLo Green was confirmed to be the support act for the North American leg of the tour in February 2011. Rihanna spoke about Green joining her on tour in a press statement, saying "I'm a huge fan of Cee Lo since his days with Goodie Mob and with Gnarls Barkley. He's a musical genius, continually reinventing himself, and I'm thrilled to have him join me on tour." However, he decided to pull out of performing on the tour, and cited schedule conflicts for his reason. For his replacement, J. Cole, B.o.B. and DJ Dummy were enlisted to be support acts for the North American leg. For the European leg of the tour, DJ Calvin Harris served as the support act.

Show incidents
After a late start to her July 8, 2011, Dallas show, a fire broke out following Rihanna's performance of "California King Bed." For safety reasons, the audience was evacuated and the concert was forced to end early.
The show wasn't rescheduled.

Concert synopsis

The show began with a short video introduction featuring Rihanna sitting on a throne wearing a black coat and a short red wig. The middle screen splits revealing Rihanna inside a purple ball wearing an electric blue dress. She begins singing "Only Girl (In the World)" surrounded by her dancers all wearing bright neon costumes. The next song, "Disturbia", follows with Rihanna taking off the blue dress and dancing around in a colorful daisy duke, leading into "Shut Up and Drive" where a car covered in graffiti is present in the middle of the stage. The first segment ends with "Man Down" where Rihanna gets inside the car and descends beneath the stage. The first video interlude titled "Le Sex Shoppe" features Rihanna dressed in white dress and a suit smoking a cigar while the words "sex" and "temptation" are whispered throughout the video. The second segment begins with a cover of Prince's "Darling Nikki" where Rihanna, dressed in a suit and holding a cane, rubs against her female dancers. The song moves into "S&M" where her female dancers remove her suit to reveal a tight black leotard and chain her to the stage. After a pillow fight with her male dancers, Rihanna then performs "Let Me", followed by "Skin" where Rihanna brings a fan onstage and gives him/her a lap dance as she descends back beneath the stage for a costume change. A brief guitar solo follows performed by Nuno Bettencourt. Rihanna returns to the stage atop a pink tank shooting puffs of smoke, with her and her dancers dressed in military gear, to perform "Raining Men". After climbing out the tank, Rihanna then performs "Hard" dancing around the stage while her dancers wield pink rifles. A mashup of "Breakin' Dishes" and Sheila E.'s "The Glamorous Life" is performed next, followed by another mashup of "Run This Town" and "Live Your Life" with Rihanna leaving the stage for another costume change.

The second video interlude features Rihanna wearing a red dress while waving sheets of chiffon in the air and ends with the spoken line: "I hate that I love you." Rihanna returns to the stage wearing a bright yellow dress in brown thigh high boots to perform "Unfaithful" on a platform behind purple neon bars. The song then moves into a solo version of "Hate That I Love You" with Rihanna sitting in a chair next to the guitarist. The segment ends with "California King Bed" with smoke covering the stage floor, followed by another guitar solo by Bettencourt. The third and final interlude features a remix of "Pon de Replay" with images from Rihanna's music videos. "What's My Name" opens the final section with Rihanna wearing a colorful sequined bra and jean shorts, dancing with her dancers. The next song, "Rude Boy", features Rihanna surrounded by her male dancers with various television screens in the background. Rihanna then puts on a pair of sunglasses and chants with the audience for "Cheers (Drink to That)", followed by "Don't Stop the Music" with vigorous choreography. Rihanna then performs "Take a Bow" and says goodbye to the audience. The encore begins with "Love the Way You Lie (Part II)" which Rihanna performs on top of a piano, before moving into the final song, "Umbrella", with Rihanna in a gold outfit, dancing with her dancers, with confetti falling from the ceiling and golden rain drops falling in the backdrops. A performance of "We Found Love" was added to the setlist and closed the show starting on November 14.

Reception

Critical
The tour has gained critical acclaim from music critics citing it as "Rihanna's best tour yet". Jane Stevenson of the Toronto Sun commented that "the two-hour, larger-than-life show lived up to the billing. And then some." Bernard Perusse of the Montreal Gazette stated that the tour was a visual spectacle saying, "Pods, dry ice, sparklers, plumes of smoke, a platform raising her from below stage and back down when needed, a moving section of the floor to convey her from one side of the stage to another, videos, writhing dancers, a cannon, arena-rock guitar solos, umpteen costume changes and maybe a record for the amount of times a performer has screamed 'Montreal!' in the centre. The fans ate it up." Jon Brean of the Minneapolis Star Tribune remarked, "The Barbadian singer is more visually and vocally dynamic than she has ever been before." Amanda Ash of the Vancouver Sun stated, "Rihanna knows how to throw a party -a sexy, steamy, tightand-bright bash where yesterday's troubles are crushed beneath mile-high stilettos and drowned by intoxicating club beats", and added, "Rihanna turned Rogers Arena into a giant dance club on Friday night."Nation News Barbados commented, "The name of Rihanna's world tour adequately described the experience at the biggest show to come to Barbados to date. It took a long time in coming, but Rihanna's first major showing in her hometown was definitely well worth the wait. Scottish tabloid Daily Record'' remarked, "R&B superstar Rihanna blew the roof off Glasgow's SECC last night with her aptly-titled Loud tour. Exploding on stage in a neon-tuned bubble, the Barbadian singer delivered an enthralling performance that never let up."

Commercial
The tour grossed $90 million overall, making it the 7th highest-grossing tour of 2011. Average ticket price of the ticket was $74.95, and the average tickets sold were 15,395. The total tickets sold were 1,200,800 and the average gross was $1,153,846 per show.

Broadcasts and recordings

Rihanna's performance during Rock In Rio was broadcast live in Brazil on Multishow, Globo.com and Rede Globo, and aired internationally on YouTube. A clip of Rihanna performing "We Found Love" on tour was aired on the Grammy Nominations Concert.

Opening acts

J. Cole (North America)
B.o.B. (North America) (selected dates)
CeeLo Green (North America) (selected dates)
DJ Dummy (North America) (selected dates) 
Calvin Harris (Europe) (selected dates)
K.T (North America) 
Cover Drive (Barbados)

Setlist

"Only Girl (In the World)"
"Disturbia"
"Shut Up and Drive"
"Man Down"
"Darling Nikki"
"S&M"
"Let Me" 
"Skin"
"Raining Men" 
"Hard"
"Breakin' Dishes" / "The Glamorous Life"
"Run This Town" / "Live Your Life"
"Unfaithful"
"Hate That I Love You"
"California King Bed"
"What's My Name?" 
"Rude Boy"
"Cheers (Drink to That)"
"Don't Stop the Music"
"Take a Bow"

Encore
"Love the Way You Lie (Part II)"
"Umbrella"

Tour dates

Additional Notes

 A  During the second performances in Toronto and Montreal, Rihanna was joined by Drake during "What's My Name?".
 B  During the performance in Uniondale, Rihanna was joined onstage by Kanye West during "Run This Town" and "All of the Lights".
 C  During the performance in East Rutherford, Rihanna was joined onstage by Jay-Z during "Run This Town" and "Umbrella".

Music festivals and other miscellaneous performances

During the Dallas concert, while Rihanna was singing California King Bed, fireworks caused a fire, so the concert was ended 
This concert is a part of On the Beach
These concerts are a part of Bergen Calling
These concerts are a part of V Festival
This concert is a part of Rock in Rio
This concert is a part of Jingle Bell Ball

Cancellations and rescheduled shows

Box office score data

References

External links
Rihanna Official Website

2011 concert tours
Rihanna concert tours